New Jersey's 13th congressional district was a congressional district which was created for the 73rd United States Congress in 1933, based on redistricting following the United States Census, 1930. It was last represented by Democrat Albio Sires when it was eliminated due to redistricting following the United States Census, 2010. Most of this district became part of a newly redrawn 8th district in 2013.

Geography
From 2003 to 2013, (based on redistricting following the 2000 Census), the district contains portions of 4 counties and 17 municipalities:

Essex County:
Newark (part; also 10)

Hudson County:
Bayonne (part), East Newark, Guttenberg, Harrison, Hoboken, Jersey City (part; also 9 and 10), Kearny (part; also 9), North Bergen (part; also 9), Union City, Weehawken, West New York

Middlesex County:
Carteret, Perth Amboy, Woodbridge Township (part; also 7)

Union County:
Elizabeth (part; also 10), Linden (part; also 7 and 10)

Demography

Before district elimination based on the last redistricting in 2013, of the district's 647,258 residents, 308,247 identified themselves as being Hispanic, accounting for 47.6% of the district's population.

2006 elections

This district was considered solidly Democratic, with the winner of the Democratic Party primary the near-certain winner in November's general election, both in the special and regular elections.

Sires won the seat in a special election on November 7, 2006, after Bob Menendez resigned from this seat on January 16, 2006 in advance of his assumption of the Senate seat vacated by Jon Corzine, who in turn left his Senate seat to become Governor of New Jersey. Sires also won the general election, and will represent the district through at least 2008.

The two most prominent names running for the seat in the regular election were the former Speaker of the New Jersey General Assembly, Albio Sires of West New York, and Assemblyman Joseph Vas, who is also Mayor of Perth Amboy, both of whom ran in the Democratic primary. While the two faced off to fill the full two-year term, Vas decided not to run in the special election to fill the two months remaining in Menendez's term.

In the primary for the full two-year term, held on June 6, 2006, Albio Sires beat Joseph Vas, capturing almost 75% of the vote.  In the general election, Sires beat Republican John Guarini who had run unopposed for the GOP nod.

In the special primary to fill the remaining two months of the current term, Sires won approximately 90% of the vote, defeating James Geron, assuring Sires of the seat as no Republican opposed him in the special election. Sires was sworn into Congress on November 13, 2006.

Election results from statewide races

List of members representing the district

References

 Congressional Biographical Directory of the United States 1774–present

13
Essex County, New Jersey
Hudson County, New Jersey
Middlesex County, New Jersey
Union County, New Jersey
Former congressional districts of the United States
Constituencies established in 1933
1933 establishments in New Jersey
Constituencies disestablished in 2013
2013 disestablishments in New Jersey